The State Register of Heritage Places is maintained by the Heritage Council of Western Australia. , 161 places are heritage-listed in the Shire of Coolgardie, of which 27 are on the State Register of Heritage Places.

List
The Western Australian State Register of Heritage Places, lists the following 27 state registered places within the Shire of Coolgardie:

References

Coolgardie
 
Coolgardie